Karishma Modi is an Indian model, actress, and television anchor.

Modi won the Femina Look of the Year in 1999 and was awarded 'Miss Talented' at the Elite Model Look '99 in France.

Modi is the founder of the Punyakarma Foundation, an NGO which works for the development of under-privileged children. She has been a panelist at the Mrs. India International since 2016.

Television
2000- Rishtey(zee tv series) episode 141 as sherry.
 2013 - 2014 Hum Ne Li Hai- Shapath as Senior Inspector Kashish
 2015 Adaalat - The Evil Twin as Advocate Anita D' Souza

References

External links
  Karishma Modi
  Femina Look of the year – 1999
 Indbazaar – Karishma Modi

Female models from Gujarat
Indian actors
Living people
1980 births